Traces is a collection of short stories written by British sci-fi author Stephen Baxter.  Unlike similar collections such as Vacuum Diagrams and Phase Space, it is not related to any particular series by Baxter (as, for example, Vacuum Diagrams is related to his Xeelee Sequence).

The book contains the following short stories:
"Traces" (1991)
"Darkness" (1995)
"The Droplet" (1989)
"No Longer Touch the Earth" (1993)
"Mittelwelt" (1993)
"Journey to the King Planet" (1990)
"The Jonah Man" (1989)
"Downstream" (1993)
"The Blood of Angels" (1994)
"Columbiad" (1996)
"Brigantia's Angels" (1995)
"Weep for the Moon" (1992)
"Good News" (1994)
"Something for Nothing" (1988)
"In the Manner of Trees" (1992)
"Pilgrim 7" (1993)
"Zemlya" (1997)
"Moon Six" (1997)
"George and the Comet" (1991)
"Inherit the Earth" (1992)
"In the MSOB" (1996)
"Afterword(Traces)" (1998, essay)

1998 short story collections
Short story collections by Stephen Baxter
Short stories by Stephen Baxter
Voyager Books books